Country Roads and the Big City is a 1921 German silent film directed by Carl Wilhelm and starring Carola Toelle, Fritz Kortner and Conrad Veidt.

The film's sets were designed by the art director Carl Ludwig Kirmse.

Cast
 Carola Toelle as Maria, ein Mädel
 Fritz Kortner as Mendel Hammerstein
 Conrad Veidt as Raphael, der Geiger
 Franz Schönemann
 Richard Georg
 Edmund Heinek

References

Bibliography
 John T. Soister. Conrad Veidt on Screen: A Comprehensive Illustrated Filmography. McFarland, 2002.

External links

1921 films
Films of the Weimar Republic
German silent feature films
Films directed by Carl Wilhelm
German black-and-white films
Terra Film films
1920s German films